Andrés Eduardo Corpancho Fort (born 1 December 1984) is a Peruvian male badminton player. He competed at the 2015 Toronto Pan Am Games.

Achievements

Pan Am Championships
Men's singles

Men's doubles

Mixed doubles

South American Games
Men's singles

Men's doubles

BWF International Challenge/Series
Men's singles

Men's doubles

Mixed doubles

 BWF International Challenge tournament
 BWF International Series tournament
 BWF Future Series tournament

References

External links 
 

Living people
1984 births
Peruvian male badminton players
Badminton players at the 2015 Pan American Games
Badminton players at the 2003 Pan American Games
South American Games gold medalists for Peru
South American Games bronze medalists for Peru
South American Games medalists in badminton
Competitors at the 2010 South American Games
Pan American Games competitors for Peru
21st-century Peruvian people